Carroll Williams is a former American football quarterback who played four seasons in the Canadian Football League (CFL) with the Montreal Alouettes and BC Lions.  He played college football at Xavier University and attended Archbishop Curley High School in Miami, Florida.

Early years
Williams played high school football and basketball for the Archbishop Curley High School Knights. He was the first African-American to enroll at the school.

College career
Williams played for the Xavier Musketeers from 1963 to 1966. He became starting quarterback for the Musketeers midway though his sophomore year in 1964. He was selected to the All-Catholic All-American Team and chosen as the 1965 Catholic College Player of the Year (The Brooklyn Tablet) after his junior year in 1965. Williams was also played in the North-South Mahi Shiner's All Star Football Game in Miami, Florida, after his senior year in 1966. He was inducted into the Xavier Athletic Hall of Fame in 1982. He recorded career totals of 4,000 yards on 33 passing touchdowns and also scored ten rushing touchdowns during his college career.

Professional career
Williams played for the CFL's Montreal Alouettes from 1967 to 1969. He lost the starting quarterback job to Sonny Wade in 1969. He played for the BC Lions of the CFL in 1970.

Personal life
Williams  worked in education after his playing career.

References

External links
Just Sports Stats
College stats

Living people
Year of birth missing (living people)
Players of American football from Miami
American football quarterbacks
Canadian football quarterbacks
African-American players of American football
African-American players of Canadian football
Xavier Musketeers football players
Montreal Alouettes players
BC Lions players
Archbishop Curley-Notre Dame High School alumni
Sportspeople from Baltimore
Players of American football from Baltimore
21st-century African-American people
Players of Canadian football from Miami